is a manga series written by Sahee Sakado and illustrated by Tori Tabii. It was adapted into a Japanese television drama series in 2013.

Characters
Tachibana (Jiro Sato)
Muranaka (Tomomi Kasai)
Nirasawa (Hitoshi Ozawa)
Gotō (Mirai Suzuki)
Konno (Yōichi Nukumizu)
Takehara (Yoshiaki Umegaki)

References

External links
Official TV drama website 

Tokuma Shoten manga
TV Tokyo original programming
2013 Japanese television series debuts
Japanese television dramas based on manga